The 158th Infantry Division (German: 158. Infanteriedivision) was a German Army infantry division in World War II.

History 
The 158th Infantry Division was raised in April 1945, where it was sent to the eastern front, which was approaching westwards to the German border.

Commanders 
Generalleutnant August Schmidt (Apr 1945 - 8 May 1945)

Operations Officers
Major Karl-Albert Keerl (1 April 1945 – 2 May 1945)

Sources

Military units and formations established in 1945
Military units and formations disestablished in 1945
Infantry divisions of Germany during World War II